The  is a Japanese electric multiple unit (EMU) commuter train type operated by the private railway operator Keio Corporation on commuter services in the western suburbs of Tokyo.

Technical details 
 Control system
 Refurbished: IGBT-VVVF
 10-car sets (6 motored cars): Chopper
 10-car sets (5 motored cars): VVVF
 8-car sets (5 motored cars): Chopper
 8-car sets (4 motored cars): VVVF
 6-car sets (4 motored cars): Chopper
 6-car sets (3 motored cars): VVVF
 4-car sets (2 motored cars): Chopper
 2-car sets (1 motored car): Chopper
 Motor output: 
 Drive mechanism: Parallel cardan shaft
 Headlights: Sealed beam
 Destination indicators: roller blind

Body 
The body is stainless steel. Early sets used corrugated panels, while sets made after 1987 had a beaten style. (Some corrugated-style cars were made after 1987 as middle cars for sets made early in production.) The sides were not painted. Fronts of early sets were the same color as the sides. The front designs are of two types, but the difference is minor.

Driver's cab
The driver's cab contains a "T"-shaped, one-handle master-controller system.
 Acceleration: 4 notch
 Deceleration: 7 notch + emergency

Formations

Current formations

6-car formations 
Sets are formed as follows:

10-car formations 
Sets are formed as follows:

 Set 7729 was scrapped in February 2020.

4-car formations 
Sets are formed as follows:

 Sets 7801 and 7802 are equipped with for "Wanman" one-person operation on the Dōbutsuen Line.

2-car formations 
Sets are formed as follows:

Past formations

8-car formations 
Sets were formed as follows:

 Sets 7708 and 7709 had their "T1" and "T2" cars scrapped and were shortened to 6-car trains in November 2017.
 Sets 7706 and 7707 were scrapped due to the arrival of the 5000 series.

Interior
Seating consists of longitudinal bench seats, arranged 4-7-7-7-4 in intermediate cars. Original sets have no passenger information displays, but refurbished sets feature 3-color LED information displays (four per car).

Operations
Used on all Keio Corporation lines. (excluding Inokashira Line)
 For daytime operation, 10-car sets or 10-car trains of six-car sets coupled to four-car sets are used as Special Express and Semi Special Express trains.
 Eight-car trains of six-car sets coupled to two-car sets are used mainly as Local or Rapid trains.

History 

The 7000 series began service in 1984. The 7000 series was built for local train service, and the first sets were five-car sets, rather than 4, 6 or 10 cars. The running performance of the new series was nearly the same as the Keio 6000 series. By 1996, 190 cars of the 7000 series had been built.

From 2001, 7000 series sets were introduced on Special Express, Semi Special Express, Express, and Rapid trains.

Keio announced in 2010 that 18 more of its 7000 series cars would be converted to VVVF inverter control.
As of 2023, all the train sets have been converted to VVVF inverter control in 2012.

References

Electric multiple units of Japan
7000 series
Train-related introductions in 1984
Kinki Sharyo multiple units
Nippon Sharyo multiple units
1500 V DC multiple units of Japan